James A. Marcus (January 21, 1867 – October 15, 1937) was an American actor. He appeared in more than 100 films between 1915 and 1937. He was born in New York City. On October 15, 1937, Marcus died in Hollywood, California from a heart attack at age 70. Marcus' most notable films include Regeneration, Oliver Twist and Sadie Thompson.

Partial filmography

 Regeneration (1915)
 Carmen (1915)
 Blue Blood and Red (1916)
 The Serpent (1916)
 The Honor System (1917)
 Betrayed (1917)
 The Conqueror (1917)
 The Pride of New York (1917)
 The Prussian Cur (1918)
 On the Jump (1918)
 Evangeline (1919) - Basil
 The Strongest (1920)
 Oliver Twist (1922)
 The Strangers' Banquet (1922)
 Come on Over (1922) as Carmody
 Beau Brummel (1924)
 The Iron Horse (1924)
 Dick Turpin (1925)
 The Goose Hangs High (1925)
 Lightnin' (1925)
 The Fighting Heart (1925)
 The Eagle (1925)
 All Around Frying Pan (1925)
 The Love Gamble (1925)
 The Scarlet Letter (1926)
 The Texas Streak (1926)
 Siberia (1926)
 The Eagle of the Sea (1926)
 The Traffic Cop (1926)
 The Bachelor's Baby (1927)
 Duck Soup (1927)
 The Meddlin' Stranger (1927)
 Life of an Actress (1927)
 The Beauty Shoppers (1927)
 Sadie Thompson (1928)
 Isle of Lost Men (1928)
 The Broken Mask (1928)
 Buck Privates (1928)
 The Border Patrol (1928)
 Revenge (1928)
 Whispering Winds (1929)
 Captain of the Guard (1930)
 Back Pay (1930)
 Liliom (1930)
 Hell's House (1932)
 Strawberry Roan (1933)
 The Trail Beyond (1934)
 Red Morning (1934)
 The Lonely Trail (1936)

References

External links

1867 births
1937 deaths
American male film actors
American male silent film actors
Male actors from New York City
20th-century American male actors
Male Western (genre) film actors